Turbonilla melea is a species of sea snail, a marine gastropod mollusk in the family Pyramidellidae, the pyrams and their allies.

Description
The shell grows to a length of 3.3 mm.

Distribution
This species occurs in the Atlantic Ocean off Georgia, USA, at a depth of 538 m.

References

External links
 To Encyclopedia of Life
 To USNM Invertebrate Zoology Mollusca Collection
 To ITIS
 To World Register of Marine Species

melea
Gastropods described in 1927